The German County Freudenthal was in the period between 1938 and 1945. It included on 1 January 1945:

 the four cities  Freudenthal, Engelberg, Bennisch and Würbenthal
 94 additional communities.

County Freudenthal had on 1 December 1930: 49,011 inhabitants, on May 17, 1939: 48,339 inhabitants and on May 22, 1947 25,998 inhabitants.

Literatur 
 Kurt Langer: Lautgeographie der Mundart in den Landkreisen Freudenthal und Jägerndorf. Selbstverlag, Prag 1944.
 Otakar Káňa. Historické proměny pohraničí: Vývoj pohraničních okresů Jeseník, Rýmařov, Bruntál a Krnov po roce 1945. Profil 1976.
 Josef Bartoš, Jindřich Schulz, Miloš Trapl: Historický místopis Moravy a Slezska v letech 1848-1960. Sv. 13, okresy : Bruntál, Jeseník, Krnov. Univerzita Palackého, Olomouc 1994. .
 Jaroslav Vencálek: Okres Bruntál. Okresní úřad, Bruntál 1998. 
 Do nitra Askiburgionu. Bruntálský slovník naučný: encyklopedie Nízkého Jeseníku. Moravská expedice, Bruntál 2004. 
 Rainer Vogel. Familiennamen in der Altvaterregion: Entstehung, Entwicklung und Bedeutung der Personennamen im Fürstentum Jägerndorf und in der Herrschaft Freudenthal (ehemals Österreich-Schlesien). Kovač, Hamburg 2014. .

Weblinks 
 Landkreis Freudenthal Historical information at the site: territorial.de (Rolf Jehke), as of 31. August 2013.
Heimatkreis Freudenthal / Altvater e. V.
Deutsch-tschechische Ortsnamen vom Landkreis Freudenthal

 County Freudenthal